Over the Hill is a 1992 Australian drama film directed by George T. Miller and starring Olympia Dukakis and Sigrid Thornton.

The film was based on Canadian writer and publisher Gladys Taylor's 1984 book Alone in the Australian Outback, a memoir of her 1977 driving trip in Australia. The memoir was adapted by Australian screenwriter Robert Caswell.

Plot
Alma can't stand to have one more birthday without seeing her estranged daughter, Elizabeth, who lives in Sydney, Australia. But Alma doesn't fit into her daughter's political-hostess life even for a visit, and she finds more sympathy in her granddaughter. Alma, in a burst of rebellion, buys a supercharged hotrod and sets out on a voyage of self-discovery to Melbourne. Along the way, she meets con artists, gangsters, and a ponytailed white-knight in a camper and she finds not only adventure and romance, but also the courage to go back and face her relationship with her daughter and set it right.

Cast
Olympia Dukakis as Alma Harris
Sigrid Thornton as Elizabeth Harris
Derek Fowlds as Dutch
Bill Kerr as Maurice
Steve Bisley as Benedict
Pippa Grandison as Margaret
Aden Young as Nick

Reception
According to Ozmovies: "The film disappeared almost without trace in its short theatrical release and reviewers in the main newspapers in Melbourne paid little attention to it." There were unfavourable reviews in The Age, The Canberra Times, and Variety.

Box office
Over the Hill grossed $87,672 at the box office in Australia.

See also
Cinema of Australia

References

External links

Over the Hill at Ozmovies

Australian drama films
1992 films
Films directed by George T. Miller
1990s English-language films
1990s Australian films